Rahimullah Choudhury was a Bengali industrialist and politician. He was a member of the 4th National Assembly of Pakistan as a representative of East Pakistan.

Early life
Choudhury was born into a Bengali Muslim family of Choudhuries in Daganbhuiyan, Feni, which was then part of the Bengal Presidency's Noakhali District.

Career
Choudhury was a member of the 4th National Assembly of Pakistan representing the Awami League, from the Noakhali-I constituency.

References

Pakistani MNAs 1965–1969
Year of birth missing
People from Daganbhuiyan Upazila